St. Augustine's Church is a Roman Catholic church in Park Slope, Brooklyn. In May 2022, the church’s gold tabernacle worth approximately $2 million was stolen. The stolen tabernacle was designed by Alfred Parfitt.

References

Roman Catholic churches in Brooklyn
Park Slope
Robberies in the United States